The Johns Hopkins Public Management Program is a public policy school affiliated with Johns Hopkins University in Washington, D.C. MA in Public Management emphasizes the fundamentals of public management: financial management, policy analysis, tax and budget policy, and public administration. The curriculum is designed for working professionals in the government and nonprofit sector. Courses may be taken at a full- or part-time pace. The program is led by Paul Weinstein, and offers a 12 course Master of Arts in Public Management. l The program began in 2011 and combines a rigorous curriculum with faculty from academia, government, nonprofit, and the private sector. A master's degree in public policy is geared toward analysts who want to delve fully into the details of economics, public finance and research. A master's in public administration is for those who are focused on the management of staff in government agencies, nonprofits and other organizations. Students usually choose one or the other. A Masters in Public Management tries to combines the two. The M.A. in Public Management have to take four core courses from a list that includes; Public Policy Evaluation and the Policy Process, Financial Management and Analysis in the Public Sector, Economics for Public Decision Making, Essentials of Public and Private Management, Quantitative Methods, and Principles of Nonprofit Management. Students choose seven electives and complete a capstone project of their own design. The goal of the capstone is to provide a detailed solution to an identified problem.

Like many graduate programs, the MA in Public Management degree can now be attained online as well as on campus. The program is a member of the Network of Schools of Public Policy, Affairs, and Administration (NASPAA).  The program is included in U.S. News & World Report list of top Public Affairs schools

Research Areas
Budget and Tax Policy
Education Policy
Health Care
Government Performance
Nonprofit Sector

References

Johns Hopkins University
Public administration schools in the United States
Public policy schools